Six athletes (four men and two women) from Bulgaria competed at the 1996 Summer Paralympics in Atlanta, United States.

Medallists

See also
Bulgaria at the Paralympics
Bulgaria at the 1996 Summer Olympics

References 

Nations at the 1996 Summer Paralympics
1996
Summer Paralympics